Who Let the Dogs Out? is a British children's Dog training Game show that aired on the CBBC Channel since 21 September 2011. The show's name is widely derived from the song of the same name by the Bahamian junkaroo band Baha Men.

In each episode, three dogs and their child owners battle it out to take home the Who Let the Dogs Out? trophy by tackling different dog tricks at the "Dog House"; such as skateboarding, skipping, frisbee catching and walking on two legs. A second series was aired in 2012. A third and fourth series aired in 2013 and 2014, with presenters Ashleigh Butler and Steve Mann.

A spin-off series, Who Let the Dogs Out and About? aired for ten episodes, beginning on 19 January 2013.

Episodes

Series 1 (2011)

Series 2 (2012)

The format was slightly changed this series; only one team would win the trophy at the series finale. In every episode, two hopefuls were eliminated but one team made it through to the next round – the quarter-finals. 27 teams were chosen by Zak and the series producer, Claire Gillies, to go to the "Dog House" after the tryouts were completed.

 Winners: Jake and his dog Ice

Series 3 (2013)
A third series aired in 2013. Beginning on 16 September 2013, it was hosted by Ashleigh Butler, with her dog Pudsey also appearing, and Steve Mann.

 Winners: TBA
 Celebrity winners: TBA

Series 4 (2014)
A fourth series began airing on 24 November 2014, it was hosted by Ashleigh Butler, with her dog Pudsey also appearing, and Steve Mann.

 Winners: TBA

Who Let The Dogs Out and About?

Who Let the Dogs Out and About is a British 10-episode children's television programme that ran for ten episodes from 19 January to 23 March 2013. The show was filmed throughout the summer of 2012 and visited various locations within the United Kingdom.

The series was hosted by Kate Edmondson, with vet Dr Scott Miller, dog expert Claire Gillies, also the series producer of Who Let the Dogs Out?, as well as Britain's Got Talent winners Ashleigh and Pudsey. The series was aired in the 9am slot on Saturday mornings.

Each episode featured a comedy animation series called Pet Squad, which was produced by Darrall Macqueen Ltd. It was shown as a 10-minute segment of the show.

Episodes

References

External links
 

2011 British television series debuts
2014 British television series endings
BBC children's television shows
BBC Scotland television shows
British children's television series